McStay is a surname. Notable people with the surname include:

 Daniel McStay (born 1995), Australian rules footballer
 Francis McStay (1892–1934), Scottish footballer with Motherwell
 Henry McStay (born 1985), football player from Lurgan in Northern Ireland
 Jimmy McStay (1893–1974), former Scottish footballer and manager
 John McStay ("Jock") (born 1965), Scottish former professional footballer
 Michael McStay (born 1933), of No Hiding Place
 Paul McStay MBE (born 1964), former football player who spent his entire career with Scottish team Celtic Football Club
 Ryan McStay (born 1985), in Bellshill, is a professional footballer
 Willie McStay (footballer, born 1894) (died 1974) former Scottish international footballer who played as a fullback
 Willie McStay (footballer, born 1961), former professional footballer
 McStay family murder, a case about an American family who went missing in 2010 and whose bodies were discovered in 2013